In ancient Roman warfare, the testudo or tortoise formation was a type of shield wall formation commonly used by the Roman legions during battles, particularly sieges.

Formation 

In the testudo formation, the men would align their shields to form a packed formation covered with shields on the front and top. The first row of men, possibly excluding the men on the flanks, would hold their shields from about the height of their shins to their eyes, so as to cover the formation's front. The shields would be held in such a way that they presented a shield wall to all sides. The men in the back ranks would place their shields over their heads to protect the formation from above, balancing the shields on their helmets, overlapping them. If necessary, the legionaries on the sides and rear of the formation could stand sideways or backwards with shields held as the front rows, so as to protect the formation's sides and rear; this reduced the speed and mobility of the formation, but offered consistent defensive strength against opposing infantry and excellent protection against arrows and other missile attacks.

Plutarch describes this formation as used by Mark Antony during his invasion of Parthia in 36 BC:

Cassius Dio writes about the testudo when describing the campaign of Mark Antony in 36 BC:

Tactical analysis 

The testudo was used to protect soldiers from all types of missiles. It could be formed by immobile troops and troops on the march. The primary drawback to the formation was that, because of its density, the men found it more difficult to fight in hand-to-hand combat and because the men were required to move in unison, speed was sacrificed. As "phoulkon", it played a great role in the tactics employed by the Byzantines against their eastern enemies.

The testudo was not invincible, as Cassius Dio also gives an account of a Roman shield array being defeated by Parthian cataphracts and horse archers at the Battle of Carrhae:

Tacitus recorded its use during the siege of the city of Cremona by the troops of Vespasian under command of Marcus Antonius Primus. During the attack the troops advanced under the rampart "holding their shields above their heads in close 'tortoise' formation".

Later usage 

The testudo was a common formation in the Middle Ages, being used by Muhammad's forces during the Siege of Ta'if in 630, also by the Carolingian Frankish soldiers of Louis the Pious to advance on the walls of Barcelona during the siege of 800–801, by Vikings during the siege of Paris in 885–886, by East Frankish soldiers under king Arnulf of Carinthia during the siege of Bergamo in 894, by Lotharingians under Conrad the Red at the siege of Senlis in 949, by Lotharingian defenders at the siege of Verdun in 984 and by the Crusaders of count Raymond IV of Toulouse during the siege of Nicaea in 1097. The testudo formation was also employed by medieval Arabs, who called it the dabbāba or "crawler". It was employed by Abu Abdallah al-Shi'i in the 906 siege of Tobna (in modern-day Algeria), where he used it to protect sappers as they advanced to the city walls, where they undermined and collapsed a tower, creating a breach for their allies to enter the city.

British "riot police" have mastered its use, both as a defensive formation and as "snatch squads", where a targeted individual is swallowed up and held in the testudo while it withdraws from the crowd. During the Euromaidan protests in Kyiv, Ukraine in 2014 the Berkut riot police used the testudo tactic to protect themselves. Israeli forces and American George Floyd protestors have been known to use the formation.

Gallery

See also 
 Mesopotamian military strategy and tactics
 Roman infantry tactics

References 

 Dio Cassius, Roman History Book 49, 30, ed. Loeb Classical Library

Bibliography 
 
 
 Cowan, Ross, Roman Battle Tactics 109BC - AD313 (Osprey 2007)
 Rance, Philip, “The Fulcum, the Late Roman and Byzantine Testudo: the Germanization of Roman Infantry Tactics?” in Greek, Roman and Byzantine Studies 44 (2004) pp. 265–326
 Plutarch, Roman Lives, ed. Robin Waterfield 
 Dio Cassius, Roman History Book 49, 30 ed. Loeb Classical Library

External links 
 

Infantry units and formations of ancient Rome
Roman shields
Roman tactical formations
Tactical formations